Chall Pass (or Challpass) (el. 747 m.) is a mountain pass in the Jura Mountains on the border of the cantons of Solothurn and Basel-Country in Switzerland. The pass road links Metzerlen and Röschenz or Laufen on the Swiss common main road number 274. The pass got his name from the mountain Challhöchi; chall is Swiss German for the German word kahl (in the meaning of bare, without forest); Höchi Swiss German for Höhe (height).

Chall Pass on the official map of the Swiss Confederacy

Mountain passes of Switzerland
Mountain passes of the Jura
Mountain passes of Basel-Landschaft
Mountain passes of the canton of Solothurn
Basel-Landschaft–Solothurn border